Pumasillo (possibly from Quechua puma cougar, sillu claw, "puma's claw") is a mountain in the Vilcabamba mountain range in the Andes of Peru which reaches a height of approximately . It is situated in the Cusco Region, La Convención Province, on the border of the districts of Santa Teresa and Vilcabamba. Pumasillo lies southwest of Choquetacarpo and Cayco at a lake named Pumasillococha (possibly from in the Quechua spelling Pumasilluqucha).

References

Mountains of Peru
Mountains of Cusco Region